36 Camelopardalis is a single star in the northern circumpolar constellation of Camelopardalis. It is visible to the naked eye as a dim point of light with an apparent visual magnitude of +5.3. Parallax measurements provide a distance estimate of approximately 710 light years away from the Sun, and it is drifting away from the Earth with a radial velocity of −1.15 km/s.

36 Camelopardalis has a stellar classification of K1 III-IIIb, which indicates that it is a K-type giant star with a mild underabundance of CH molecules in its spectrum.

References

Camelopardalis (constellation)
Durchmusterung objects
Camelopardalis, 36
041927
029490
2165
K-type giants